"Satisfya" is a Pakistani-Punjabi hip-hop single by Imran Khan, released on 10 May 2013 via an independent record label called IK Records owned by him. The song has 830+ million views on YouTube.

Reception 
As of 14 November 2022, the song's official music video has over 810 million views on the media platform YouTube. It is one of the most popular songs by Imran Khan. Produced by Eren E and Directed by David Zennie. Asian Image described the song as catchy and motivational. It has gained popularity after it was used in many Tik-Tok and other short videos sharing medias mainly in the Indian subcontinent.

References

External links 
 Satisfya on Spotify
 Satisfya on iTunes

2013 songs
2013 singles
Punjabi-language songs
Pakistani songs